"Feel Alright" is a song by Kardinal Offishall.

Feel Alright may also refer to:
"Feel Alright", a song by Komiko 
"Feel Alright", a song by Garageland

See also
I Feel Alright, an album by Steve Earle
"1970", alternate title "I Feel Alright", a song by The Stooges on Fun House